Corporate Pollution is the third album by Irish grunge band Paradox, released on March 15, 2011.

Track listing

Credits
Pete Mac – Guitar, vocals and Bass
Mike Mac – Drums / vocals
Produced by Pete Mac and Mike Mac

External links 
 discogs.com

2011 albums
Paradox (Irish band) albums